Dr. Erika Szabó (born 19 January 1959) is a Hungarian jurist and politician, who served as Secretary of State for Public Administration and Justice between 2 June 2010 and 5 June 2014. As candidate of Fidesz, she became a member of the National Assembly (MP) in the 1998 parliamentary election. She was also MP between 1990 and 1994, as member of the Alliance of Free Democrats (SZDSZ).

References

1959 births
Living people
University of Szeged alumni
Hungarian jurists
Women members of the National Assembly of Hungary
Alliance of Free Democrats politicians
Fidesz politicians
Members of the National Assembly of Hungary (1990–1994)
Members of the National Assembly of Hungary (1998–2002)
Members of the National Assembly of Hungary (2002–2006)
Members of the National Assembly of Hungary (2006–2010)
Members of the National Assembly of Hungary (2010–2014)
People from Szentes
20th-century  Hungarian women politicians
21st-century Hungarian women politicians